A binary code represents text, computer processor instructions, or any other data using a two-symbol system. The two-symbol system used is often "0" and "1" from the binary number system. The binary code assigns a pattern of binary digits, also known as bits, to each character, instruction, etc. For example, a binary string of eight bits (which is also called a byte) can represent any of 256 possible values and can, therefore, represent a wide variety of different items.

In computing and telecommunications, binary codes are used for various methods of encoding data, such as character strings, into bit strings. Those methods may use fixed-width or variable-width strings. In a fixed-width binary code, each letter, digit, or other character is represented by a bit string of the same length; that bit string, interpreted as a binary number, is usually displayed in code tables in octal, decimal or hexadecimal notation. There are many character sets and many character encodings for them.

A bit string, interpreted as a binary number, can be translated into a decimal number. For example, the lower case a, if represented by the bit string 01100001 (as it is in the standard ASCII code), can also be represented as the decimal number "97".

History of binary codes

The modern binary number system, the basis for binary code, was invented by Gottfried Leibniz in 1689 and appears in his article Explication de l'Arithmétique Binaire. The full title is translated into English as the "Explanation of the binary arithmetic", which uses only the characters 1 and 0, with some remarks on its usefulness, and on the light it throws on the ancient Chinese figures of Fu Xi. Leibniz's system uses 0 and 1, like the modern binary numeral system. Leibniz encountered the I Ching through French Jesuit Joachim Bouvet and noted with fascination how its hexagrams correspond to the binary numbers from 0 to 111111, and concluded that this mapping was evidence of major Chinese accomplishments in the sort of philosophical visual binary mathematics he admired. Leibniz saw the hexagrams as an affirmation of the universality of his own religious belief.

Binary numerals were central to Leibniz's theology. He believed that binary numbers were symbolic of the Christian idea of creatio ex nihilo or creation out of nothing. Leibniz was trying to find a system that converts logic verbal statements into a pure mathematical one. After his ideas were ignored, he came across a classic Chinese text called I Ching or ‘Book of Changes’, which used 64 hexagrams of six-bit visual binary code. The book had confirmed his theory that life could be simplified or reduced down to a series of straightforward propositions. He created a system consisting of rows of zeros and ones. During this time period, Leibniz had not yet found a use for this system.

Binary systems predating Leibniz also existed in the ancient world. The aforementioned I Ching that Leibniz encountered dates from the 9th century BC in China. The binary system of the I Ching, a text for divination, is based on the duality of yin and yang. Slit drums with binary tones are used to encode messages across Africa and Asia. The Indian scholar Pingala (around 5th–2nd centuries BC) developed a binary system for describing prosody in his Chandashutram.

The residents of the island of Mangareva in French Polynesia were using a hybrid binary-decimal system before 1450. In the 11th century, scholar and philosopher Shao Yong developed a method for arranging the hexagrams which corresponds, albeit unintentionally, to the sequence 0 to 63, as represented in binary, with yin as 0, yang as 1 and the least significant bit on top. The ordering is also the lexicographical order on sextuples of elements chosen from a two-element set.

In 1605 Francis Bacon discussed a system whereby letters of the alphabet could be reduced to sequences of binary digits, which could then be encoded as scarcely visible variations in the font in any random text. Importantly for the general theory of binary encoding, he added that this method could be used with any objects at all: "provided those objects be capable of a twofold difference only; as by Bells, by Trumpets, by Lights and Torches, by the report of Muskets, and any instruments of like nature".

George Boole published a paper in 1847 called 'The Mathematical Analysis of Logic' that describes an algebraic system of logic, now known as Boolean algebra. Boole's system was based on binary, a yes-no, on-off approach that consisted of the three most basic operations: AND, OR, and NOT. This system was not put into use until a graduate student from Massachusetts Institute of Technology, Claude Shannon, noticed that the Boolean algebra he learned was similar to an electric circuit. In 1937, Shannon wrote his master's thesis, A Symbolic Analysis of Relay and Switching Circuits, which implemented his findings. Shannon's thesis became a starting point for the use of the binary code in practical applications such as computers, electric circuits, and more.

Other forms of binary code

The bit string is not the only type of binary code: in fact, a binary system in general, is any system that allows only two choices such as a switch in an electronic system or a simple true or false test.

Braille
Braille is a type of binary code that is widely used by the blind to read and write by touch, named for its creator, Louis Braille. This system consists of grids of six dots each, three per column, in which each dot has two states: raised or not raised. The different combinations of raised and flattened dots are capable of representing all letters, numbers, and punctuation signs.

Bagua 
The bagua are diagrams used in feng shui, Taoist cosmology and I Ching studies. The ba gua consists of 8 trigrams; bā meaning 8 and guà meaning divination figure. The same word is used for the 64 guà (hexagrams). Each figure combines three lines (yáo) that are either broken (yin) or unbroken (yang). The relationships between the trigrams are represented in two arrangements, the primordial, "Earlier Heaven"  or "Fuxi" bagua, and the manifested, "Later Heaven,"or "King Wen" bagua. (See also, the King Wen sequence of the 64 hexagrams).

Ifá, Ilm Al-Raml and Geomancy
The Ifá/Ifé system of divination in African religions, such as of Yoruba, Igbo, and Ewe, consists of an elaborate traditional ceremony producing 256 oracles made up by 16 symbols with 256 = 16 x 16. An initiated priest, or Babalawo, who had memorized oracles, would request sacrifice from consulting clients and make prayers. Then, divination nuts or a pair of chains are used to produce random binary numbers, which are drawn with sandy material on an "Opun" figured wooden tray representing the totality of fate.

Through the spread of Islamic culture, Ifé/Ifá was assimilated as the "Science of Sand" (ilm al-raml), which then spread further and became "Science of Reading the Signs on the Ground" (Geomancy) in Europe.  

This was thought to be another possible route from which computer science was inspired, as Geomancy arrived at Europe at an earlier stage (about 12th Century, described by Hugh of Santalla) than I Ching (17th Century, described by Gottfried Wilhelm Leibniz).

Coding systems

ASCII code
The American Standard Code for Information Interchange (ASCII), uses a 7-bit binary code to represent text and other characters within computers, communications equipment, and other devices. Each letter or symbol is assigned a number from 0 to 127. For example, lowercase "a" is represented by 1100001 as a bit string (which is "97" in decimal).

Binary-coded decimal
Binary-coded decimal (BCD) is a binary encoded representation of integer values that uses a 4-bit nibble to encode decimal digits. Four binary bits can encode up to 16 distinct values; but, in BCD-encoded numbers, only ten values in each nibble are legal, and encode the decimal digits zero, through nine. The remaining six values are illegal and may cause either a machine exception or unspecified behavior, depending on the computer implementation of BCD arithmetic.

BCD arithmetic is sometimes preferred to floating-point numeric formats in commercial and financial applications where the complex rounding behaviors of floating-point numbers is inappropriate.

Early uses of binary codes
 1875: Émile Baudot "Addition of binary strings in his ciphering system," which, eventually, led to the ASCII of today.
 1884: The Linotype machine where the matrices are sorted to their corresponding channels after use by a binary-coded slide rail.
 1932: C. E. Wynn-Williams "Scale of Two" counter
 1937: Alan Turing electro-mechanical binary multiplier
 1937: George Stibitz "excess three" code in the Complex Computer
 1937: Atanasoff–Berry Computer
 1938: Konrad Zuse Z1

Current uses of binary
Most modern computers use binary encoding for instructions and data. CDs, DVDs, and Blu-ray Discs represent sound and video digitally in binary form. Telephone calls are carried digitally on long-distance and mobile phone networks using pulse-code modulation, and on voice over IP networks.

Weight of binary codes
The weight of a binary code, as defined in the table of constant-weight codes, is the Hamming weight of the binary words coding for the represented words or sequences.

See also
 Binary number
 List of binary codes
 Binary file
 Unicode
 Gray code

References

External links
 Sir Francis Bacon's BiLiteral Cypher system, predates binary number system.
 
 Table of general binary codes.
 Table of Nonlinear Binary Codes. Maintained by Simon Litsyn, E. M. Rains, and N. J. A. Sloane. Updated until 1999.
  cites some pre-ENIAC milestones.

Computer data
English inventions
Encodings
Gottfried Wilhelm Leibniz
2 (number)